"The Road to Boston" is a Revolutionary War marching song  and was  made the official Ceremonial March of Massachusetts in 1985. It is unknown who composed this march. It is sometimes known by the alternative name of "March to Boston".   It has more recently been adapted to a fiddle tune, and remains popular to this day.

References

External links
The law designating the official ceremonial march of Massachusetts

American military marches
Music of Massachusetts
Massachusetts
Year of song unknown
Songs about Massachusetts